E-Rotic (stylized as e-Rotic) was a Playboy TV newsmagazine profiling popular adult websites and the personalities behind them.

Format
Similar to the format of the other Playboy TV shows, Sexcetera and 69 Sexy Things 2 Do Before You Die, e-Rotic used investigative journalism to probe behind popular sex-driven websites.

Two sites were profiled per episode, broken apart between the "tech geek" team of Justin Michael and Jacob Reed, and the female co-hosts Bridget Banks (aka Carla Harvey, co-vocalist of heavy metal band Butcher Babies) and Kate Brenner. Per most episodes, the guys tend to use humorous approaches toward their segments, while the girls go for a more sexy feel.

Since its debut in April 2009, sites profiled have included Naughty America, Ken Marcus' erotic galleries, and the personal homepage of adult actress, Catalina Cruz.

The second episode profiled the personal homepage of fitness, bikini and glamor model Jenny Poussin at Jenny Poussin VIP.

Playboy regular Kira Reed served as consulting producer.

References

External links
e-Rotic Official Site

2009 American television series debuts
2009 American television series endings
Television series by Playboy Enterprises
Playboy TV original programming